William Wagott was Archdeacon of Totnes during 1482.

References

Archdeacons of Totnes
15th-century English clergy